Haplothrix blairi is a species of beetle in the family Cerambycidae. It was described by Stephan von Breuning in 1935, originally misspelled as Hoplothrix blairi. It is known from Thailand, Myanmar, Laos, and Vietnam.

References

Lamiini
Beetles described in 1935